General elections were held in Mexico on 7 July 1940. The presidential elections were won by Manuel Ávila Camacho, who received 93.9% of the vote. In the Chamber of Deputies election, the Party of the Mexican Revolution won all but one of the 173 seats.

The campaign was very intense, with clashes between Camacho's and Almazán's supporters becoming common throughout the electoral process. The elections were the most violent in Mexican history, with clashes between Camacho's and Almazán's supporters on election day resulting in at least 47 deaths and 400 people being injured.

Campaign
Although initially Francisco José Múgica was seen as the likely successor of President Lázaro Cárdenas due to their shared leftist ideology, in the end President Cárdenas appointed Manuel Ávila Camacho as the PRM's presidential candidate. The decision was made due to Ávila Camacho's perceived conciliatory nature and the fact that he was a devout Catholic, which was crucial to defuse tensions between the Party and the Catholic Church in the aftermath of the bloody Cristero War, as well as to appeal to the conservative sectors of the country which had fiercely opposed Cárdenas social reforms. Cárdenas himself explained: "Gral. Múgica, a very dear friend of mine, was a widely known radical. We had barely avoided a civil war and we were putting up with tremendous international pressure due to the oil expropriation. What use could there be in a radical?" 

Nevertheless, most Mexican conservatives chose to support an opposition candidate, which they found in Juan Andreu Almazán. A former revolutionary combatant who later served as Communications Minister under Pascual Ortiz Rubio's administration and accumulated great wealth from construction works, Almazán presented himself as a right-wing candidate who would put an end to the "Comunazi degeneration" of the Cárdenas administration, although he promised to maintain the social reforms in case he won.

Conduct
On election day, a group of Almazán's supporters attempted to get into the National Palace to protest against the alleged electoral fraud that was taking place. In response, Paramilitary groups shot and killed many of them.

The violence in Mexico City on election day was so severe that President Lázaro Cárdenas himself was unable to vote at his polling place until the nearby violence calmed down. There were violent incidents in other parts of the country as well.

Results

President

Chamber of Deputies

Aftermath
Almazán refused to recognize the official results, claiming that the PRM had organized the violence against his supporters, as well as accusing it of stealing ballot boxes and preventing Almazán's supporters to vote for him.

Afterwards, Almazán fled to La Habana, unsuccessfully seeking support from the United States, which recognized Ávila Camacho's victory (although the US Government had opposed Cárdenas' social reforms, they saw Almazán's alleged fascist sympathies as a bigger threat). When it became clear that it would be impossible to change the results, Almazán gave up on the idea of a violent revolt. He returned to Mexico and attended the inauguration of Ávila Camacho.

References

Presidential elections in Mexico
Mexico
General
Legislative elections in Mexico
July 1940 events
Election and referendum articles with incomplete results